Cana Store and Post Office is a historic general store and post office building located near Mocksville, Davie County, North Carolina. It was built about 1875, and is a two-story, three-bay, frame building with a gable roof. The front facade features a broad hip-roofed frame canopy added in the 1930s that serves as a porte-cochere. Also on the property is a contributing one-story woodshed built in the 1930s. The building housed a post office until 1954 and a general store until 1965.

It was added to the National Register of Historic Places in 2001.

References

Commercial buildings on the National Register of Historic Places in North Carolina
Post office buildings on the National Register of Historic Places in North Carolina
Commercial buildings completed in 1875
Buildings and structures in Davie County, North Carolina
National Register of Historic Places in Davie County, North Carolina